Alex Courtès is a French artist and director of music videos and features.

Career
After studying at Penninghen, he began his career by creating album artwork for French house musicians, such as Cassius, Daft Punk, and Air. He also designed Daft Punk's iconic helmets.

In 1999, he directed a music video for the duo Cassius and international artists such as Phoenix, Kylie Minogue, Sébastien Tellier, Jamiroquai, Franz Ferdinand, Justice, Kasabian and The White Stripes.

Filmography

Fiction
 2015- Au service de la France – Série Arte
 2012- Les Infidèles - segments "Bernard", "Thibault", "Simon" et "Les Infidèles Anonymes"
 2011- The Incident

Music videos
 2018 - Sean Paul & Major Lazer - Tip Pon It
 2017 - Justice - Pleasure (Live) 
 2017 - Cassius ft Cat Power & Pharrell Williams – Go Up 
 2014 - Kasabian - Bumblebeee  
 2013 - Jackson and His Computer Band - Dead Living Things  
 2012 - Willy Moon - Yeah Yeah  
 2012 - Sébastien Tellier - Cochon Ville  
 2012 - Justice - On'n'On  
 2009 - Alice in Chains - Check My Brain  
 2009 - U2 - Magnificent  
 2009 - U2 - Get on Your Boots  
 2008 - Kaiser Chiefs - Good Days Bad Days  
 2008 - Snow Patrol - Take Back the City  
 2006 - Kasabian - Shoot the Runner  
 2005 - Kylie Minogue - Giving You Up
 2005 - Wolfmother - Woman  
 2005 - Jamiroquai - (Don't) Give Hate a Chance 
 2005 - U2 - City of Blinding Lights 
 2004 - U2 - Vertigo  
 2003 - Jane's Addiction - Just Because 
 2003 - The White Stripes - Seven Nation Army  
 2002 - Cassius - I am a Woman 
 2002 - Cassius - Sound of violence 
 2001 - Phoenix - If I Ever Feel Better 
 2001 - Air - Radio Number 1  
 1999 - Cassius - Cassius 99

Commercial
 2019 Smart Energy GB - I Want
 2016- Puma – Work, Win & Celebrate 
 2016- France television – Les Jeux Olympiques Rio 2016 
 2015- Lexus – Flow 
 2015- Paco Rabanne - 1 million  
 2015- Paco Rabanne - Olympea 
 2014- Paco Rabanne - Lady Million 
 2014- Carolina Herrera - 212 
 2013- Paco Rabanne - Invictus  
 2013- Peugeot – 208 GTI 
 2013- Adidas - Unite all originals

Recognition
In 2005, Courtès won a Grammy Award for "Vertigo" by U2. In 2013, his Willy Moon video won the best pop video award at UK MVA. He was also nominated at D&AD.

In 2015, Courtès directed the first season of a TV show about the French secret service in the 1960s, Au service de la France and he was developing a feature thriller film.

In 2017, he directed music video "Go Up" for Cassius in teamwork with Pharrell Williams and Cat Power.

Nominations
 On’n’On, Justice 
UK Video Music Awards 2012 | Best International Pop Video
 Cochon Ville, Sebastien Tellier 
UK Video Music Awards 2012 | Best Pop Video Budget

Awards
 Yeah Yeah, Willy Moon
UK Video Music Awards 2013 | Best Pop Video
 Dead Living Things, Jackson & His Computer Band
Art Directors Club 2013 • In Book | Music Video
 Cochon Ville, Sebastien Tellier
Art Directors Club 2012 • In Book | Music Video

References

Living people
French male artists
French music video directors
Year of birth missing (living people)